Bellator 260: Lima vs. Amosov was a mixed martial arts event produced by Bellator MMA that took place on June 11, 2021, at Mohegan Sun Arena in Uncasville, Connecticut. The event was the first Bellator event with fans in attendance since Bellator 240 in February 2020 due to the COVID-19 pandemic.

Background 
The event was headlined by a Bellator Welterweight World Championship between current titleholder Douglas Lima and undefeated Yaroslav Amosov. It was the first event in 15 months that will have live fans in the audience. A 175 lb catchweight bout between #8 Paul Daley and #3 Jason Jackson was the co-main event.

A featherweight bout between #6 ranked Aaron Pico and Aiden Lee took place on the main card of the event.

A welterweight bout between Demarques Jackson and Mark Lemminger was announced as the main card opener.

A featherweight bout between Tywan Claxton and Justin Gonzales, as well as a lightweight bout between Nick Newell and Bobby King took place in the preliminary portion of the card. A featherweight bout between Lucas Brennan and Matt Skibicki were likewise on the preliminary portion of the card.

A welterweight bout between Kyle Crutchmer and Levan Chokheli, as well as a middleweight bout between Taylor Johnson and Lance Wright took place at the event. The Johnson and Wright bout was moved a week before the event to Bellator 261.

A women's featherweight bout between Marina Mokhnatkina and Amanda Bell also took place on the event's preliminary card.

A 128 lb catchweight bout between Vanessa Porto and Ilara Joanne was announced for the event. However, after weigh-ins, Porto was deemed unfit to compete by the commission and the bout was scrapped.

The former LFA Light-Heavyweight champion Alex Polizzi and Gustavo Trujillo competed in the sole light-heavyweight fight of the card.

Results

See also 

 2021 in Bellator MMA
 List of Bellator MMA events
 List of current Bellator fighters
 Bellator MMA Rankings

References 

Bellator MMA events
Events in Uncasville, Connecticut
2021 in mixed martial arts
June 2021 sports events in the United States
2021 in sports in Connecticut
Mixed martial arts in Connecticut
Sports competitions in Connecticut